Lacrosse Canada, formerly the Canadian Lacrosse Association, founded in 1867, is the governing body of lacrosse in Canada. It conducts national junior and senior championship tournaments for men and women in both field and box lacrosse. There are five national teams that compete in World Lacrosse championships on a four-year cycle.

Championships
Box
Mann Cup Senior "A"
Presidents Cup Senior "B"
Minto Cup Junior "A"
Founders Cup Junior "B"
16U Girls Box Nationals
16U Boys Box Nationals 
14U Girls Box Nationals 
14U Boys Box Nationals 
12U Boys Box Nationals
21U Junior Women's Nationals 

Field
Ross Cup Senior Division I
Victory Trophy Senior Division II
First Nations Trophy U18 Boys
Alumni Cup U15 Boys
U19 Women's Field Nationals

Bodies
Alberta Lacrosse Association
British Columbia Lacrosse Association
Fédération de crosse du Québec
First Nations Lacrosse Association
Lacrosse New Brunswick
Lacrosse Nova Scotia
Lacrosse PEI
Manitoba Lacrosse Association
Newfoundland Lacrosse Association
Ontario Lacrosse Association
Saskatchewan Lacrosse Association

Leagues

Senior A
Major Series Lacrosse
Western Lacrosse Association

Senior B 
 Can-Am Lacrosse League
 Nova Scotia Senior Lacrosse League
 OLA Senior B Lacrosse League
 Quebec Senior Lacrosse League
 Rocky Mountain Lacrosse League
 Three Nations Senior Lacrosse League
 West Coast Senior Lacrosse Association
 Prairie Gold Lacrosse League

Junior A
British Columbia Junior A Lacrosse League
Ontario Junior A Lacrosse League
Rocky Mountain Lacrosse League

References

External links
Lacrosse Canada official website

 
1867 establishments in Ontario